The Ministry of Civil Aviation in India is the nodal ministry responsible for the formulation of national policies and programmes for the development and regulation of civil aviation. It devises and implements schemes for the orderly growth and expansion of civil air transport in the country. Its functions also extend to overseeing airport facilities, air traffic services and carriage of passengers and goods by air. The ministry also administers the implementation of the Aircraft Act, 1934, Aircraft Rules, 1937 and is administratively responsible for the Commission of Railway Safety.

Composition of the ministry  
The ministry is under the charge of Union Minister Jyotiraditya Scindia and Minister of State V. K. Singh. The secretary, an IAS officer, is administrative the head of the ministry and is assisted by one additional secretary and financial adviser, three joint secretaries, seven officers of the level of director/deputy secretary / financial controller and ten officers of the level of undersecretary. It is located at Rajiv Gandhi Bhavan, Safdarjung Airport, New Delhi.

Structure
The ministry has under its ownership the following central government establishments:

Directorates

Directorate General of Civil Aviation (DGCA)

Regulatory Bodies
Airports Economic Regulatory Authority (AERA)

Attached Offices
Bureau of Civil Aviation Security (BCAS)
Commission of Railway Safety - The commission is the rail safety authority in India, as directed by the 1989 Railways Act. The agency investigates rail accidents.
Aircraft Accident Investigation Bureau (AAIB)

Training Institutions

Indira Gandhi Rashtriya Uran Akademi (IGRUA)

Statutory Bodies

Airports Authority of India

Central Public Sector Undertakings

Pawan Hans

Aircraft projects
Civil Aviation Department RG-1 Rohini
Civil Aviation Department MG-1
Civil Aviation Department Mrigasheer
Civil Aviation Department Revathi
Hindustan Ardhra

List of ministers

List of Ministers of State

See also

 Aviation in India

References

External links

 
Civil Aviation